Dangerous Ground may refer to:

Film
 Dangerous Ground (1934 film), a British mystery film
 Dangerous Ground (1997 film), an action thriller film starring Ice Cube and Elizabeth Hurley
 Escapade (1932 film), an American crime film also known as Dangerous Ground

Music
 Dangerous Ground (soundtrack), the soundtrack to the 1997 film Dangerous Ground

Places
 Dangerous Ground (South China Sea), an area in the Spratly Islands, South China Sea

See also
 On Dangerous Ground (disambiguation)